The S-25 is a Soviet air-to-ground rocket launched from aircraft. It is launched from the O-25 pod which can hold one rocket. The missile first entered service with the Soviet Air Force in 1975.

Variants
The rocket has four variants:
S-25-OF with high explosive-fragmentation warhead
S-25-O with fragmentation warhead and radio proximity fuze
S-25-OFM for use against hardened targets
S-25L (LD) laser-guided variant

References

Air-to-ground rockets of the Soviet Union